Tappan may refer to:

People
 Tappan (Native Americans)
 Arthur Tappan (1786–1865), abolitionist
 Benjamin Tappan (1773–1857), Ohio senator 
 Clair S. Tappaan (1878–1932), California judge and Sierra Club president
 Eli Todd Tappan (1824–1888), president of Kenyon College, 1868–1875
 Henry Philip Tappan (1805–1881), president, University of Michigan, 1852–1863
 James Camp Tappan (1825–1906), Confederate Army Brigadier General
 Lewis Tappan (1788–1873), abolitionist, developer of credit reporting service
 Lewis Northey Tappan (1831–1880), abolitionist, Western pioneer and a founder of Colorado City
 Mary Tappan Wright (née Tappan; 1851–1916), writer
 Mel Tappan (1933–1980), survivalist writer 
 Samuel F. Tappan (1831–1913), US Army officer, journalist, Native American advocate
 Stacey Tappan (born 1973), American lyric soprano
 Tappan Wright King (born 1950), editor
 W. J. Tappan (fl. 1881), founder of the Ohio Valley Foundry Company, later renamed Tappan Stove Company

Places

United States
 Tappan, Ohio, an unincorporated community
 Tappan, West Virginia, an unincorporated community
 Lake Tappan, a reservoir on the Hackensack River
 Old Tappan, New Jersey, a town in Bergen County
 Tappan Lake, a reservoir in Harrison County, Ohio
 Tappan, New York, a hamlet in Rockland County
 Tappan Zee, widening of the Hudson River
 Tappan Zee Bridge (1955–2017), a former bridge at the Tappan Zee
 Tappan Zee Bridge (2017–present) (Governor Mario M. Cuomo Bridge), the replacement for the 1955 bridge

Other
 Tappan (brand), a brand of stoves owned by Electrolux, founded by W.J. Tappan

See also